Irving Lee Goode (born October 12, 1940) is a former American football guard who played thirteen seasons in the National Football League.

Goode was drafted by the St. Louis Cardinals in 1962 and played with the Cardinals through the 1971 season.  He spent his first two seasons as a left tackle and then was the Cardinals starting left guard from 1964 through 1971.  He was named to the Pro Bowl team in 1964 and 1967.  He was traded to the Buffalo Bills before the 1972 season in exchange for offensive lineman Joe O'Donnell.  Goode missed the entire 1972 season after suffering a knee injury during preseason.  He was traded to the Miami Dolphins before the 1973 season in exchange for defensive tackle Mike Kadish, who had been Miami's first round draft pick the prior season.  He served as the Dolphins' regular long snapper for field goals and extra points, as well as a backup offensive lineman, for the Dolphins' Super Bowl VIII champion team in 1973.  After receiving little playing time in 1974, Goode retired prior to the 1975 season.

References

1940 births
Living people
American football offensive linemen
St. Louis Cardinals (football) players
Miami Dolphins players
Eastern Conference Pro Bowl players
Kentucky Wildcats football players